Maximilian Engl (born 31 December 1997) is a German professional footballer who plays as a goalkeeper for Kickers Offenbach.

Career
Engl made his professional debut for Rot-Weiß Erfurt on 8 October 2017 in the Thuringian Cup, coming on as a substitute for Philipp Klewin in the 2–1 away loss against fellow 3. Liga club Carl Zeiss Jena.

References

External links
 
 

1997 births
Living people
German footballers
Association football goalkeepers
TSV 1860 Munich II players
TSV 1860 Munich players
FC Rot-Weiß Erfurt players
VfR Garching players
Türkgücü München players
FC Augsburg II players
Kickers Offenbach players
Regionalliga players
3. Liga players